Olympia Heist op den Berg is a Belgian ice hockey team in the city of Heist-op-den-Berg. They play in the newly formed BeNe-league, a joint league starting in the season 2015-2016, consisting of the top teams from the Netherlands and Belgium. The league consists of 16 teams, 10 from the Netherlands and 6 from Belgium.

History
The club was founded in 1959, and have won eleven Belgian Hockey League championships, second to Brussels Royal IHSC, which has won twenty-three titles. On their twentieth anniversary in 1979, Op den Berg won their first Belgian championship. Despite winning eleven national titles, the club has only won the Belgian Cup twice, in 1994 and 2010.

Season Results
Note: GP = Games played, W = Wins, OTW = Overtime Wins, OTL = Overtime Losses, L = Losses, GF = Goals for, GA = Goals against, Pts = Points

Achievements
Belgian Champion (11): 1979, 1983, 1986 1987, 1988, 1989, 1990, 1991, 1992, 1999, 2004 
Belgian Cup winner (2): 1994, 2010

External links
Official website
Club profile on hockeyarenas.net

Ice hockey teams in Belgium
Ice hockey clubs established in 1959
1959 establishments in Belgium
Sport in Heist-op-den-Berg